Lawrence Mynott (born 1 March 1954) is an English book illustrator, designer and portrait painter.

Biography 

Mynott was born in London, UK on 1 March 1954. He graduated from the Chelsea School of Art and the Royal College of Art.

Mynott's paintings have enjoyed much commercial interest. He has provided illustrations for book covers for Penguin Books. He has also worked with publishers Thames and Hudson. His work has been exhibited at the Royal Society of Portrait Painters and at the National Portrait Gallery, London.

His writing has appeared in fashion magazines such as Tatler and Harper's Bazaar. He was featured in the "Games People Play" feature at The Independent in 1998.

Mynott lives with his wife graphic designer Anthea Mynott, in a "whimsical rooftop apartment" in Tangier.

Books
2014, Yves Saint Laurent: A Moroccan Passion, Pierre Bergé and Lawrence Mynott, Abrams Books, 
2013, The Granny Alphabet, by Tim Walker  and Kit Hesketh-Harvey, Thames & Hudson,

Awards
Gold and Silver awards from the D&AD.

References

External links
Penguin Books James Joyce - Ulysses cover by Lawrence Mynott

1954 births
Living people
British illustrators
People from Tangier
Alumni of the Royal College of Art
Alumni of Chelsea College of Arts
20th-century English painters
English male painters
21st-century English painters
20th-century English male artists
21st-century English male artists